The 2010 African Championships in Athletics was held in Nairobi, Kenya from, 28 July to 1 August 2010.

Background
The African Championships in Athletics were held in Kenya for the first time. Previously two major athletics events have been held in Kenya, namely 1987 All-Africa Games and 2007 IAAF World Cross Country Championships.

Preparations

The championships were awarded to Kenya at the April 2007 Confederation of African Athletics Congress in Dakar, Senegal.

The event was originally scheduled to be held from April 28 to May 2, 2010, but due to delayed preparations the event was moved forward. The Moi International Sports Centre was initially set to become the host venue, but it was later changed to the smaller Nyayo Stadium.

Men's results

Track

Field

Women's results

Track

Field

Medal table

Participating nations

 (16)
 (6)
 (5)
 (14)
 (12)
 (8)
 (12)
 (1)
 (10)
 (11)
 (2)
 (14)
 (2)
 (6)
 (63)
 (2)
 (3)
 (14)
 (2)
 (106)
 (2)
 (5)
 (3)
 (6)
 (1)
 (5)
 (15)
 (19)
 (5)
 (6)
 (37)
 (7)
 (14)
 (13)
 (14)
 (1)
 (5)
 (41)
 (7)
 (1)
 (21)
 (4)
 (7)
 (27)
 (9)
 (4)

References

Daily reports
 Negash, Elshadai (2010-07-27). High powered rivalries expected in Nairobi – African Championships preview . IAAF. Retrieved on 2010-07-31.
 Negash, Elshadai (2010-07-28). Kiprop takes men’s 10,000m as African championships begin in Nairobi . IAAF. Retrieved on 2010-07-31.
 Negash, Elshadai (2010-07-29). Meite, Okagbare take 100m titles, Cheruiyot over Defar again in the 5000m - African champs Day 2 . IAAF. Retrieved on 2010-07-31.
 Negash, Elshadai (2010-07-30). Rudisha sizzles 1:42.84 in Nairobi as Kenya collects three golds in Nairobi - African champs, day 3 . IAAF. Retrieved on 2010-07-31.
 Negash, Elshadai (2010-07-31). Dibaba takes down Masai in 10,000m to notch first Ethiopian gold in Nairobi - African champs, day 4 . IAAF. Retrieved on 2010-07-31.
 Negash, Elshadai (2010-08-01). Kenya captures five gold medals  as African champs conclude in Nairobi - African champs, day 5 . IAAF. Retrieved on 2010-08-01.

External links
 Results
 Confederation of African Athletics website

 
A
African Championships in Athletics
A
International athletics competitions hosted by Kenya
2010 in Kenyan sport
Sport in Nairobi
2010s in Nairobi